Work etiquette is a code that governs the expectations of social behavior in a workplace. This code is put in place to "respect and protect time, people, and processes." There is no universal agreement about a standard work etiquette, which may vary from one environment to another. Work etiquette includes a wide range of aspects such as body language, good behavior, appropriate use of technology, etc. Part of office etiquette is working well with others and communicating effectively.

Dress code 

Dress codes are often enforced in the workplace to "dress in a manner appropriate to their responsibilities." They also allow for a "aesthetical recognition" between members and non-members. Commonly, employers won't specifically have a dress code, rather the dress code is regulated through norms and perpetuated through its employees.  Business casual is a commonly used term when describing what kind of clothing is appropriate for the workplace. However, specific clothing regulations varies from profession to profession. An example would be how in an office workplace, it is not appropriate for employees to wear denim jeans and a T-shirt.

Clothing is not the only thing that dress codes may regulate. Oftentimes, dress codes regulate accessories such as jewelry and hats. For instance, with the exception of religious headgear, most dress codes deem it inappropriate to wear hats in the workplace. Casual Fridays are sometimes allowed in certain workplaces, which allows the employee to wear jeans or a casual shirt that is inoffensive to others.

Communication and healthy work relationships 
Proper "business etiquette and manners" are a very key role in building relationships in the workplace. In order to maintain healthy work relationships, employees must be team players, this means having "transparency, [being] caring and empathetic understanding." Also, using proper body language is important in the workplace. An employee presenting themselves in a manner that shows respect demonstrates to those above them that they always maintain professionalism. Something as simple as a handshake speaks volumes about a person. "Good handshakes" have been found to be integral for maintaining professionalism and demonstrating respect. Guides emphasize to "grip the other person's hand firmly, shake three times, and let go." Maintaining eye contact is a good skill to always remember as eye contact shows interest in the person speaking. Being civil is also very crucial, so as to avoid "negative workplace communication." One should avoid using foul language, especially if it is a continuous problem. People should also be aware of their health and be considerate of others, by not coming into work sick; this can affect everyone else's health as well. People shouldn't boast about their salaries, or on the contrary, complain all of the time. It is important to be aware of your very own actions. Getting into a heated argument or even physical violence in the workplace is not only inappropriate, but can result in getting fired as most workplaces have a "zero-tolerance" policy on workplace violence of any kind.

Using Technology 
Technology also is an important and emerging resource the workplace. However, since it is a more recent development in the workplace, not many rules have been implemented regarding its limits. In terms of cell phones, it is up to the company to regulate cell phone usage. However, in certain professions like construction, it is against Occupational Safety and Health Administration (OSHA) regulations to "engage in any practice or activity that diverts his/her attention while actually engaged in operating the equipment, such as the use of cellular phones" and using it could lead to suspension or termination.

In terms of other technology, such as computers, online etiquette is just as vital to maintaining healthy relationships and professionalism. It is important to make sure when writing emails, memos, or using any form of communication that isn't face-to-face to be clear and concise so there will be no confusion between coworkers. However, many workplaces consider it unsuitable for the workplace to use technology at work in order to use social media platforms or play games. Many employers use disciplinary action to prevent employees from using technology inappropriately. Inappropriate use of technology can be but is not limited to, blogging, instant messaging (IM), using your email for anything not work related, or texting.

Furthermore, despite disciplinary action for using technology inappropriately in the workplace, many are still spending their work time trolling on the web, significantly affecting work motivation, work focus, and even in-person interactions. Additionally, Globalization, technology, and the constant 24/7 connection is affecting work structures (Stajkovic, 2018). This especially influences millennials, having grown up in the age of technology and the smart phone. Millennials, always “plugged in,” have become addicted to technology, checking their phones on average 43 times a day (Entrepreneur, 2014).

According to Borae Jin and Namakee Park (n.d.), greater cell phone usage is linked to poorer social skills and more loneliness. Communicating via messaging, emails or phone calls should be the same as communicating in person, only, it’s not. Via instant messaging and emails people are able to think about a response. They are able to write out, analyze, and decide what they are going to say, taking as long as necessary, not forcing people to learn to think quick on their feet. In person communication is one of the most important parts of professional careers, especially with meetings and networking, and millennials are not efficiently learning these skills.

Cell phone usage also affects work focus. It is impossible to multitask. Our brain just can’t function that way. According to Bob Sullivan and Hugh Thomson (2013), if you do two things at once, both efforts end up suffering. There was a study done where 3 groups were taking a test and the 1st group was not interrupted, but the other 2 were by a phone call or a text message. The interrupted groups answers were 20 percent less correct (Sullivan and Thomson, 2013). It is seemingly impossible to get through anything without a phone call, text message, or emails popping up. Spending time checking these notifications and the time taken to stop and start doing work distracts from getting work done on time.

Not only are millennials constantly connected and feel anxious from not having their phone, they also feel anxious from not being able to check their social media to see what their peers are doing. This also affects cognitive load. 40% of US employees feel doubtful about their ability to handle today’s job demands (Stajkovic, 2018). It creates stress, impacts anxiety and depression, and leads to a lack of confidence in the workplace.

See also
 Etiquette
 Concert etiquette

Bibliography 
 Price, E. (2014). Corporate Life: BUSINESS ETIQUETTE THROUGHOUT THE ORGANIZATION. US Black Engineer and Information Technology, 38(3), 18-19. 
 DeIuliis, D., PhD. (2016). Workplace communication. Communication Research Trends, 35(1), 3.
 Gay, G. (2015). Corporate Life: DOE FUNDING GIVES BOOST TO HBCUS: ENERGY PROJECTS GENERATE FRESH IDEAS. US Black Engineer and Information Technology, 39(1), 18-19. 
 HOFFMAN, E. (2010). Working Effectively ACROSS the Generations. Perspectives on Work,13(2), 29–32. 
 Topper, E. (2005). Working Knowledge: Designing Dress Codes. American Libraries, 36(9), 80–80. Retrieved from  
 Goldner, H. (2010). You're Going to Wear That? Appearance in the Workplace. GPSolo, 27(1), 20-24. Retrieved fromhttp://www.americanbar.org/content/newsletter/publications/gp_solo_magazine_home/gp_solo_magazine_index/goldner.html
 Bazin, Y., & Aubert-Tarby, C. (2013). Dressing professional, an aesthetic experience of professions. Society and Business Review, 8(3), 251–268 http://www.emeraldinsight.com/doi/full/10.1108/SBR-04-2013-0031
 Swaya, M., & Eisenstein, S. (2005). Emerging Technology in the Workplace. The Labor Lawyer, 21(1), 1–17. 
 Valo, M. L. (n.d.). The Development of Intercultural Relationships at Work. Retrieved October 26, 2016, from http://www.immi.se/intercultural/nr31/lahti.html
 Sklar, Monica. (2010). Aesthetic expressions: punk dress and the workplace.. Retrieved from the University of Minnesota Digital Conservancy, http://hdl.handle.net/11299/100926.
 Scheller Arsht, S. (2014). "This is how worklife should be": Quality connections, positive relationships, and positive organizational climate (Order No. 3641252). Available from ProQuest Dissertations & Theses A&I: Literature & Language; ProQuest Dissertations & Theses A&I: Social Sciences; ProQuest Dissertations & Theses Global: Literature & Language; ProQuest Dissertations & Theses Global: Social Sciences. (1627186850). Retrieved from http://digitalrepository.unm.edu/cgi/viewcontent.cgi?article=1048&context=cj_etds

References

Etiquette by situation
Workplace